Below is a list of covered bridges in Kentucky. There are eleven surviving authentic covered bridges in the U.S. state of Kentucky, and they are all historic. A covered bridge is considered authentic not due to its age, but by its construction. An authentic bridge is constructed using trusses rather than other methods such as stringers, a popular choice for non-authentic covered bridges.  There once were hundreds of these in Kentucky.

Bridges

Extant

Former

See also

 List of bridges on the National Register of Historic Places in Kentucky
 World Guide to Covered Bridges

References

Further reading

External links

 National Society for the Preservation of Covered Bridges
 Lexington Visitors Center article about the state's covered bridges

Kentucky
 
covered bridges
Bridges, covered